Wilton Mall is a regional shopping center, located off Interstate 87 exit 15 in the town of Wilton, directly north of Saratoga Springs, New York. As of 2022, the mall currently maintains the traditional chains JCPenney, Dick's Sporting Goods, HomeGoods, in addition to Healthy Living Market and a Planet Fitness. The mall currently features a number of prominent specialty stores which are American Eagle, Bath and Body Works, Ulta Beauty, Francesca's, Old Navy, Maurices, Yankee Candle, Shoe Dept., Talbot's, and Zumiez.

It is currently owned by Macerich, having been purchased from Wilmorite Properties of Rochester, New York in 2004.

The later 2010's saw multiple traditional chain anchors update their brick-and-mortar fleets after being disrupted by digital retailers in recent years.

In August 2018, it was announced regional division The Bon-Ton would shutter as part of bankruptcy. As of February 2023, the original Bon-Ton is envisioned to transform into 400 additional residences and townhouses.

In 2018, It was announced a branch for Saratoga Hospital would replace Sears.

In March 2022, Macerich the mall owner unveiled its plan to further develop the shopping concourse with up to 400 residences and townhouses, something it has done at its malls before including Tysons Corner Center. The developers envision adding many additional features such as a theater, art gallery, microbreweries, distilleries, row houses, an indoor pool, cocktail lounges, and even laboratories and research centers.

References

External links
 Official website

Shopping malls in New York (state)
Macerich
Buildings and structures in Saratoga County, New York
Tourist attractions in Saratoga Springs, New York